Football is the most popular sport in The Gambia and still growing in popularity.

National football team
 
The Gambia national football team, nicknamed The Scorpions, is the national team of the Gambia and is administered by the Gambia Football Association. They have never qualified for the World Cup. In the  2021 Africa Cup of Nations Gambia reached the second round of the competition for the first time.

Men's league system

GFA League First Division
 
The GFA League First Division currently has twelve clubs competing in it. The most successful club is Wallidan.

GFA League Second Division
 
The GFA League First Division currently has ten clubs competing in it.

3rd Division Triangular Tournament
promotion tournament to second division, top-2 qualify for second division.

National Third Division League

locally known as “Nawettan” (This word is derived from the Wolof tongue, one of several local languages and means seasonal tournament). It is the third highest competition in the country's national football rankings and is divided into eight mini- leagues of twenty teams each in different zones, of which all league champions from the different Local Governing Bodies (LGB) are contested in the Second Division, qualifiers and only the best three of the eight teams will proceed to battle it out in the Triangular play-offs. The emerging two best of the three teams are finally promoted to the National Second Division League.

Women's football

National Football League Division One
The National First Division currently has six clubs competing in it.

National Football League Division Two
The National First Division currently has five clubs competing in it.

The Gambia stadiums

See also
Gambian Cup
GFA League First Division
List of football clubs in the Gambia

References